Života Panić (3 November 1933 – 19 November 2003) was a Yugoslav  military officer who served as the last acting Minister of Defense of Yugoslavia and the Chief of the General Staff of the Armed Forces of Yugoslavia.

Biography
Panić, who held the rank of General, was in charge of the Yugoslav People's Army after the resignation of General Blagoje Adžić in 1992. Panić was in office from 1992 until 1993 (in the Federal Republic of Yugoslavia) through the dissolution of the Socialist Federal Republic of Yugoslavia. In 1993, he was dismissed from his post for scandals relating to his son, Goran, who was supplying the army at supposed inflated prices.

Panić graduated from Yugoslavian military school as a tank commander and gradually rose through the ranks of the Yugoslav People's Army through the 1970s and 1980s. He was given authority over the 1st Army District (Belgrade) and was the senior officer in charge of the units which fought in the battle of Vukovar. With the dissolution of Yugoslavia, on 27 April 1992 Panić was offered a position of chief of staff in the new Yugoslav Army. Panić began to re-align the Yugoslav army in 1993 with new battle-plans and strategies, but was not prepared for the political power struggles that were occurring in Belgrade at the time and retired.

Panić died in Belgrade on 19 November 2003, shortly after his 70th birthday.

External links
 Article in the New York Times
 Article in the Rutgers University Libraries
 Article in the University at Buffalo

|-

1933 births
2003 deaths
People from Trstenik, Serbia
Military personnel of the Croatian War of Independence
Chiefs of Staff of the Yugoslav People's Army
Generals of the Yugoslav People's Army